Noorda arfakensis is a moth in the family Crambidae. It was described by George Hamilton Kenrick in 1912. It is found in Western New Guinea, Indonesia.

References

Moths described in 1912
Crambidae